Cleeve Hill is a  biological Site of Special Scientific Interest south of Lambourn in Berkshire.

Cleeve Hill is a sloping chalk grassland site with mixed scrub in the northern part. It is in the North Wessex Downs, which is an Area of Outstanding Natural Beauty.

Fauna

The site has the following fauna:

Invertebrates
Dark green fritillary
Melanargia galathea
Cupido minimus

Flora

The site has the following flora:

Zerna erecta
Brachypodium sylvaticum
Crataegus monogyna
Cornus sanguinea
Viburnum lantana
Corylus avellana
Campanula glomerata
Carlina vulgaris
Dactylorhiza fuchsii
Helianthemum chamaecistus
Linum catharticum
Lotus corniculatus
Pimpinella saxifraga
Primula veris
Thymus drucei
Thymus pulegioides
Scabiosa columbaria
Succisa pratensis
Gentianella amarella
Gentianella germanica
Platanthera chlorantha
Listera ovata

References

Sites of Special Scientific Interest in Berkshire
Lambourn